

The Chyeranovskii BICh-18 Muskulyot (or sometimes Cheranovsky BICh-18) is an experimental Soviet man-powered ornithopter designed and built by Boris Ivanovich Cheranovsky. The BiCH-18 was a lightweight wooden construction biplane with two pairs of high aspect ratio wings moved by muscle power. It was first flown in 1937 by R.A. Pischuchev as a glider with the wings locked and launched by cable.

Specifications

See also

References

Notes

Bibliography

 

1930s Soviet experimental aircraft
BiCH-18
Ornithopters
Human-powered aircraft